Primary direction is a term in astronomy for the reference meridian used in a celestial coordinate system for that system's longitude.

See also
 Celestial coordinate system
 Geographic coordinate system

References

Astronomical coordinate systems
Astronomy
Navigation
Cartography